The 8th AVN Awards ceremony, organized by Adult Video News (AVN) took place on January 12, 1991, at the Tropicana Hotel & Casino in Paradise, Nevada. During the ceremony, AVN Awards were presented in 60 categories honoring pornographic films released the previous year in the United States. The ceremony was videotaped for later pay-per-view broadcast. Actor Tom Byron hosted with seven co-hosts throughout the show.

House of Dreams won seven awards, the most of any feature, including Best Film. Other winners included Beauty and the Beast, Part 2 with five awards, while gay movie More Of A Man took four. Three movies took three awards: The Last X-Rated Movie, The Masseuse and Pretty Peaches 3, while Buttman’s Ultimate Workout and The Rise each won two trophies.

Winners and nominees

The winners were announced during the awards ceremony on January 12, 1991. Besides being named Best Film, House of Dreams also won Best Director—Film for Andrew Blake and the Best Sex Scene in a Film Award.

Major awards

Winners are listed first, highlighted in boldface, and indicated with a double dagger.

{| class=wikitable
|-
! style="background:#89cff0" width="50%" | Best Film
! style="background:#89cff0" width="50%" | Best Shot-on-Video Feature
|-
| valign="top" |
 House of Dreams
 The Masseuse
 A Night at the Waxworks
 Night Trips II
 A Portrait of Christy
 Pretty Peaches 3
 Radioactive
 The Swap
| valign="top" |
 Beauty and the Beast, Part 2
 All That Sex
 Fantasy Nights
 Forbidden Games
 The Last X-Rated Movie
 Never Enough
 The New Barbarians I & II
 Out For Blood
 Shadow Dancers I & II
 Steal Breeze
 Strange Curves
 A Touch of Gold
|-
! style="background:#89cff0" width="50%" | Best Actor—Film
! style="background:#89cff0" width="50%" | Best Actress—Film
|-
| valign="top" |
 Randy Spears, The Masseuse
 Jerry Butler, The Swap
 Rick Savage, A Portrait of Christy
 Wayne Summers, Radioactive
 Randy West, Torrid Without a Cause 2
| valign="top" |
 Hyapatia Lee, The Masseuse
 Tracey Adams, Pretty Peaches 3
 Christy Canyon, A Portrait of Christy
 Jennifer Stewart, The Swap
 Tori Welles, Torrid Without A Cause 2
|-
! style="background:#89cff0" width="50%" | Best New Starlet
! style="background:#89cff0" width="50%" | Best Actress—Video
|-
| valign="top" |
 Jennifer Stewart
 Raquel Darrian
 Sabrina Dawn
 Ashlyn Gere
 Madison
 Sunny McKay
 Danielle Rogers
 Zara Whites
| valign="top" |
 Lauren Brice, Married Women
 Tracey Adams, Beauty and the Beast, Part 2
 Jeanna Fine, Steal Breeze
 Lauren Hall, The Tease
 Angel Kelly, Little Miss Dangerous
 Lynn LeMay, Midnight Fire
 Victoria Paris, The New Barbarians
 Tori Welles, Out For Blood
|-
! style="background:#89cff0" width="50%" | Best Supporting Actor—Film
! style="background:#89cff0" width="50%" | Best Supporting Actress—Film
|-
| valign="top" |
 Jon Martin, Pretty Peaches 3
 Buck Adams, Radioactive
 Tom Byron, Torrid Without a Cause 2
 Mike Horner, The Whore
 Joey Silvera, The Whore
| valign="top" |
 Diedre Holland, Veil
 Tracey Adams, The Whore
 Sharon Kane, The Swap
 Keisha, Pretty Peaches 3
 Madison, Torrid Without a Cause 2
 Samantha Strong, Images of Desire
 Viper, Midnight Fire
|-
! style="background:#89cff0" width="50%" | Best Supporting Actor—Video
! style="background:#89cff0" width="50%" | Best Supporting Actress—Video
|-
| valign="top" |
 Ron Jeremy, Playin’ Dirty
 Buck Adams, Confessions of a Chauffeur
 Jerry Butler, Steal Breeze
 Jamie Gillis, Paris By Night
 Mike Horner, Sex Trek 1
 Joey Silvera, Strange Curves
 Randy West, New Barbarians II
| valign="top" |
 Nina Hartley, The Last X-Rated Movie
 Lauren Brice, Shadow Dancers I & II
 Sabrina Dawn, Beauty and the Beast, Part 2
 Patricia Kennedy, Steal Breeze
 Sharon Mitchell, The Last X-Rated Movie
 Samantha Strong, Fantasy Nights
 Susan Vegas, All the Right Motions
|-
! style="background:#89cff0" width="50%" | Best Director—Film
! style="background:#89cff0" width="50%" | Best Director—Shot-on-Video Feature
|-
| valign="top" |
 Andrew Blake, House of Dreams
 Buck Adams, Radioactive
 John T. Bone, Images of Desire
 Alex de Renzy, Pretty Peaches 3
 Paul Thomas, A Portrait of Christy
| valign="top" |
 Paul Thomas, Beauty and the Beast 2
 Greg Dark, Between the Cheeks 2
 Rinse Dream, Night Dreams 2
 Scotty Fox, All That Sex
 Cecil Howard, The Last X-Rated Movie
 John Leslie, Strange Curves
 Fred J. Lincoln, Princess of the Night
 Henri Pachard, Steal Breeze
 Anthony Spinelli, Never Enough
 John Stagliano, Shadow Dancers I & II
|-
! style="background:#89cff0" width="50%" | Best All-Sex Feature
! style="background:#89cff0" width="50%" | Best All-Girl Video
|-
| valign="top" |
 Buttman's Ultimate Workout
 Bend Over Babes
 Buttman Goes to Rio
 Sporting Illustrated
 Total Reball
 Unauthorized Biography of Rob Blow
| valign="top" |
 Ghost Lusters
 Anal Annie’s All-Girl Escort Service
 Cat Lickers
 Girls Gone Bad 2: The Breakout
 Kittens
 Rock Me
 Wet ’n Working
 Where The Boys Aren’t 3
|-
! style="background:#89cff0" width="50%" | Best Specialty Tape—Big Bust
! style="background:#89cff0" width="50%" | Best Specialty Tape—Bondage
|-
| valign="top" |
 Breast of Britain #8
 Breast of Britain #10
 Breaststroke 3
 Girls of Double D XII
 Tit Tales
| valign="top" |
 House of Dark Dreams I & II
 The Challenge
 Daddy Gets Punished
 Face of Fear
 Journey Into Submission
 Nancy Crew Meets Dr. Friedenstein
 Tantala’s Fat Rack
 Warehouse Slaves Discipline
|-
! style="background:#89cff0" width="50%" | Best Selling Tape of 1990
! style="background:#89cff0" width="50%" | Best Renting Tape of 1990
|-
| valign="top" |
 House of Dreams
| valign="top" |
 Pretty Peaches 3
|-
! style="background:#89cff0" width="50%" | Best Sex Scene—Film
! style="background:#89cff0" width="50%" | Best Video Sex Scene—Couple
|-
| valign="top" |
 Sabre, Nikki Wilde, Sebastian; Beach sequence, House of Dreams
 Debi Diamond, Wayne Summers; The Book
 Jeanna Fine, Zara Whites; House of Dreams
 Christy Canyon, T. T. Boy, Peter North; A Portrait of Christy
 Tracey Adams, Gene Carrera; Pretty Peaches 3
 Peter North, Samantha Strong; Secrets
 Ashlyn Gere, Rocco Siffredi; Secrets
 Diedre Holland, Jon Dough; Veil
| valign="top" |
 Victoria Paris, Randy West; Beauty and the Beast 2
 Chantelle, John Stagliano; Bend Over Babes
 Debi Diamond, T. T. Boy; Caught From Behind 13
 Eric Edwards, Brandy Alexandre; Making Tracks
 Joey Silvera, Sabrina Dawn; Never Enough
 Tori Welles, Eric Price; Out For Blood
 Victoria Paris, Jerry Butler; Sam’s Fantasy
 Sabrina Dawn, Joey Silvera; Swedish Erotica Featurettes IV
 Ashlyn Gere, Randy West; Total Reball
 Sunny McKay, Randy West; A Touch of Gold
|-
! style="background:#89cff0" width="50%" | Best Video Group Sex Scene
! style="background:#89cff0" width="50%" | Best All-Girl Video Sex Scene
|-
| valign="top" |
 Sunny McKay, Alexandria Quinn, Rocco Siffredi; Buttman's Ultimate Workout Sabrina Dawn, Rachel Ryan, Randy Spears; Beauty and the Beast, Part 2
 Debi Diamond, Blake Palmer, James Lewis, Tom Byron, T. T. Boy; Between the Cheeks 2
 Ashlyn Gere, Selena Steele, Tom Byron; The Last Resort
 Debi Diamond, Buck Adams, Sean Michaels, T. T. Boy, 2 more guys; Nasty Girls
 Casey Williams, Ashley Dunne, Randy West, Joey Silvera; Sexual Intent
 Bridgette Monroe, Randy West, Sabrina Dawn; Trick Tracey
| valign="top" |
 Victoria Paris, Sabrina Dawn; The New Barbarians Victoria Paris, Sabrina Dawn; Beauty and the Beast, Part 2
 Tianna, Lois Ayres; Between the Cheeks 2
 Madison, Angela Summers; Cat Lickers
 Tianna, Bionca, Victoria Paris; Ghost Lusters
 Alice Springs, Barbara Dare; L. A. Stories
 Cassandra Dark, Alexandria Quinn; Rock Me
 Niki Wilde, Celia Young, Champagne; Wet ’n Working
|}

Additional award winners

These awards were also presented at the awards show:

 Best Actor—Gay Video: Joey Stefano, More Of A Man
 Best Actor—Video Feature: Eric Edwards, The Last X-Rated Movie
 Best Amateur Tape: Fantasy Realm
 Best Anal-Themed Feature: Between The Cheeks 2
 Best Art Direction: House of Dreams
 Best Bisexual Video: The Last Good Bi
 Best Box Cover Concept: Fatliners, Executive Video
 Best Box Cover Concept, Gay Video: Black in Black, Associated Video Group
 Best Cinematography: House of Dreams
 Best Compilation Tape: Only the Best 3—Then 'Til Now
 Best Director—Bisexual Video: Paul Norman, Bi and Beyond IV 
 Best Director—Gay Video: Taylor Hudson, The Rise
 Best Editing For A Film: House of Dreams
 Best Editing For A Video Feature: Beauty and the Beast, Part 2
 Best Editing, Gay Video: Michael Zen, He-Devils
 Best Featurette Tape: Beat the Heat
 Best Gay Solo Tape: Straight to Bed
 Best Gay Video Feature: More Of A Man
 Best Music: Shadow Dancers I & II

 Best Newcomer, Gay Video: Jason Ross
 Best Non-Sexual Performance: Jose Duval, Oh What A Night
 Best Non-Sexual Performance, Gay Video: Chi Chi LaRue, More Of A Man
 Best Original Music, Gay Video: Myriam Zadeck, Full Exposure
 Best Overall Marketing Campaign: Vegas series, CDI Home Video
 Best Packaging—Feature Film: Pretty Peaches 3, VCA Pictures
 Best Packaging, Gay Video: Desert Fox, Vivid Man
 Best Packaging—Video Feature: Diedre in Danger, Vivid Video
 Best Pro Amateur Tape: More Dirty Debutantes 3
 Best Screenplay—Film: Mark Haggard, The Masseuse
 Best Screenplay, Gay Video: Jerry Douglas, More Of A Man
 Best Screenplay—Video: Anne Randall, The Last X-Rated Movie
 Best Sex Scene, Gay Video: Ryan Yeager, Scott Bond; The Rise
 Best Softcore Release: Sea of Dreams
 Best Specialty Tape—Other Genres: Life in the Fat Lane
 Best Supporting Actor, Gay Video: Ryan Yeager, Stranded
 Best Tease Performance: Chantelle, Bend Over Babes
 Best Videography: Beauty and the Beast, Part 2
 Best Videography, Gay Video:' John Trennell, Idol EyesHonorary AVN Awards

Special Achievement Award

 General Video of America
 Philip Harvey and Adam & Eve
 First Amendment Lawyers Association
 Deep Throat—20th Anniversary

Hall of Fame

AVN Hall of Fame inductees for 1991 were: Barbara Dare, Christy Canyon, Randy West, Tom Byron, Hyapatia Lee, Shanna McCullough, Sharon Kane, Eric Edwards, Jim and Artie Mitchell

 Multiple nominations and awards 

The following eight movies received multiple awards:

 7 - House of Dreams 5 - Beauty and the Beast, Part 2 4 - More Of A Man 3 - The Last X-Rated Movie, The Masseuse, Pretty Peaches 3 2 - Buttman’s Ultimate Workout, The Rise Presenters and performers 

The following individuals, in order of appearance, presented awards or performed music or comedy. The show's trophy girl was Alexandria Quinn.

 Presenters 

 Performers 

 Ceremony information 

Actor Tom Byron hosted the show for the first time. He had several co-hosts: Jeanna Fine in Part 1, Nina Hartley and Gloria Leonard for the Hall of Fame entrants portion, Ashlyn Gere and Chi Chi LaRue for the next portion and Britt Morgan and Rick Savage for the final awards.

The show was videotaped for later pay-per-view broadcast and a VHS video release by VCA Pictures.House of Dreams was announced as the Best Selling Tape of 1990 while Pretty Peaches 3 was announced as the Best Renting Tape of 1990.

Critical reviewsInside X-Rated Video called the awards show “marvelous” and more tranquil than the Consumer Electronics Show, which many adult entertainment companies had booths at.

 See also 

 AVN Award for Best Actress
 AVN Award for Best Supporting Actress
 AVN Award for Male Performer of the Year
 AVN Award for Male Foreign Performer of the Year
 AVN Award for Female Foreign Performer of the Year
 AVN Female Performer of the Year Award
 List of members of the AVN Hall of Fame

Notes

 The AVN Awards Show Official Program says Bi and Beyond V was the nominee in the Best Director—Bisexual Video category. However, AVN magazine, in listing the show's award winners, had Bi and Beyond IV'' as the winner. There is no record of which is the typographical error. Both movies were released in 1990, so either could be correct.

References

External links 

 
 Adult Video News Awards at the Internet Movie Database
 
 
 

AVN Awards
1990 film awards
AVN Awards 8